"L.A." is a single recorded by Amy Macdonald, which was released in October 2007. It reached #48 in the UK Singles Charts.

Track listings

CD 1
 "L.A."   
 "Mr. Brightside" (Live from King Tut's)

CD 2
 "L.A."
 "Mr Rock & Roll" (Live from King Tut's)  
 "Footballer's Wife" (Live from King Tut's)

7" vinyl
 "L.A."  
 "Footballer's Wife" (Live from King Tut's)

Music video 
The music video of "L.A." consists of her in a van singing and playing her guitar and then her performing live.This music video was filmed in Málaga in Spain.

"L.A." music video

Charts

References

2007 singles
Amy Macdonald songs
Songs written by Amy Macdonald
2007 songs